Chinedu Udoka Onyelonu (born 26 November 1992) is a Nigerian footballer who plays for Vietnamese club Becamex Bình Dương as a forward.

References

1992 births
Living people
Nigerian footballers
Nigerian expatriate footballers
Nigerian expatriate sportspeople in Vietnam
Expatriate footballers in Vietnam
Association football forwards
V.League 1 players
Becamex Binh Duong FC players